Slimming Mirrors, Flattering Lights is the second album by Canadian indie pop band The Awkward Stage, released June 10, 2008 on Mint Records.

Track listing
 "The Sun Goes Down on Girlsville"
 "Your Heart Serves Only You"
 "Anime Eyes"
 "(prettier...)"
 "Skeletal Blonde"
 "Hey Modern Schoolgirl"
 "Only Good Days Caught on Camera"
 "(than...)"
 "True Love on Three with Feeling"
 "We Dreamt of Houses"
 "I Hurt the Ones that Love Me"
 "(them...)"
 "Youth Is a War"
 "Miniskirt of Christmas Lights"
 "(Dandelion)"

Production
 Howard Redekopp - Producer, Engineer, Mixer

References

2008 albums
The Awkward Stage albums
Mint Records albums